Maximilian Nierenstein (also known as Moses Max Nierenstein or Max Nierenstein; 1877–1946) was a professor of biochemistry at the University of Bristol.

He is known for the Nierenstein reaction, an organic reaction describing the conversion of an acid chloride into an haloketone with diazomethane.

In 1912, Polish biochemist Casimir Funk isolated a complex of micronutrients and proposed the complex be named "vitamine" (a portmanteau of "vital amine"), a name reportedly suggested by friend Max Nierenstein.

He also studied natural phenols and tannins found in different plant species. He showed in  1945 that luteic acid, a molecule present in the myrobalanitannin, a tannin found in the fruit of Terminalia chebula, is an intermediary compound in the synthesis of ellagic acid. Working with Arthur George Perkin, he prepared ellagic acid from algarobilla and certain other fruits in 1905. He suggested its formation from galloyl-glycine by Penicillium in 1915. Tannase is an enzyme that Niederstein used to produce m-digallic acid from gallotannins. He proved the presence of catechin in cocoa beans in 1931.

He also worked on milk and caseinogen. He reviewed the discovery of lactose in 1936.

Works

References

External links 
 http://www.treccani.it/enciclopedia/maximilian-nierenstein/ (Italian)

1877 births
1946 deaths
German biochemists
Vitamin researchers